Tomokazu Maruyama (born 25 February 1925) is a Japanese sport shooter who competed in the 1956 Summer Olympics.

References

External links
 

1925 births
Possibly living people
Japanese male sport shooters
ISSF rifle shooters
Olympic shooters of Japan
Shooters at the 1956 Summer Olympics
Shooters at the 1954 Asian Games
Shooters at the 1958 Asian Games
Asian Games medalists in shooting
Asian Games bronze medalists for Japan
Medalists at the 1958 Asian Games
20th-century Japanese people